David Martín may refer to:

 David Martín (water polo) (born 1977), Spanish water polo player
 David Martín García (born 1992), Spanish footballer

See also 
 David Martin (disambiguation)